The siege of Jebus is described in passages of the Hebrew Bible as having occurred when the Israelites, led by King David, besieged and conquered the Canaanite city of Jerusalem, then known as Jebus. The Israelites gained access to the city by conducting a surprise assault, and Jebus (or Jerusalem) was subsequently installed as the capital city of the United Kingdom of Israel under its initial name as the City of David.

The identification of Jebus with Jerusalem has been challenged. He states that "There is no evidence of Jebus and the Jebusites outside of the Old Testament. Some scholars reckon Jebus to be a different place from Jerusalem; other scholars prefer to see the name of Jebus as a kind of pseudo-ethnic name without any historical background".

Biblical description

See also
Siege of Jerusalem (disambiguation), list of sieges for and battles of Jerusalem

References

Jebus
David
Jebus
Land of Israel
Jebus
Jebus
Jebusites